Sierra County is a county located in the U.S. state of New Mexico. As of the 2020 Census, the population was 11,576. Its county seat is Truth or Consequences.

Geography

Adjacent counties
 Catron County - northwest
 Socorro County - north
 Lincoln County - northeast
 Otero County - east
 Doña Ana County - south
 Luna County - south
 Grant County - west

National protected areas
 Cibola National Forest (part)
 El Camino Real de Tierra Adentro National Historic Trail (part)
 Gila National Forest (part)

Major highways

Demographics

2000 census
As of the 2000 census, there were 13,270 people, 6,113 households, and 3,618 families living in the county. The population density was 3 people per square mile (1/km2). There were 8,727 housing units at an average density of 2 per square mile (1/km2). The racial makeup of the county was 86.97% White, 0.48% Black or African American, 1.48% Native American, 0.17% Asian, 0.08% Pacific Islander, 8.27% from other races, and 2.54% from two or more races. 26.28% of the population were Hispanic or Latino of any race.

There were 6,113 households, out of which 20.40% had children under the age of 18 living with them, 47.50% were married couples living together, 8.60% had a female householder with no husband present, and 40.80% were non-families. 35.90% of all households were made up of individuals, and 19.30% had someone living alone who was 65 years of age or older. The average household size was 2.13 and the average family size was 2.75.

In the county, the population was spread out, with 20.10% under the age of 18, 5.40% from 18 to 24, 19.50% from 25 to 44, 27.40% from 45 to 64, and 27.70% who were 65 years of age or older. The median age was 49 years. For every 100 females there were 100.00 males. For every 100 females age 18 and over, there were 97.70 males.

The median income for a household in the county was $24,152, and the median income for a family was $29,787. Males had a median income of $24,570 versus $19,839 for females. The per capita income for the county was $15,023. About 13.80% of families and 20.90% of the population were below the poverty line, including 31.50% of those under age 18 and 14.70% of those age 65 or over.

2010 census
As of the 2010 census, there were 11,988 people, 5,917 households, and 3,126 families living in the county. The racial makeup of the county was 85.6% white, 1.7% American Indian, 0.4% black or African American, 0.4% Asian, 8.6% from other races, and 3.3% from two or more races. Those of Hispanic or Latino origin made up 28.0% of the population. In terms of ancestry, 14.0% were German, 9.4% were American, 8.4% were English, and 8.0% were Irish.

Of the 5,917 households, 17.8% had children under the age of 18 living with them, 40.0% were married couples living together, 8.9% had a female householder with no husband present, 47.2% were non-families, and 40.8% of all households were made up of individuals. The average household size was 1.98 and the average family size was 2.64. The median age was 54.5 years.

The median income for a household in the county was $25,583, the lowest of any county in New Mexico. The median income for a family was $38,641. Males had a median income of $32,059 versus $26,213 for females. The per capita income for the county was $16,667. About 15.6% of families and 22.5% of the population were below the poverty line, including 29.8% of those under age 18 and 12.9% of those age 65 or over.

Spaceport America
Spaceport America is located in Sierra County, 45 miles (72 kilometers) north of Las Cruces and 30 miles (48 kilometers) east of Truth or Consequences. Sierra County voters approved the creation of a spaceport tax district in April 2008, freeing up funding for its construction. The first launch from Spaceport America occurred on September 25, 2006, since which over 300 launches have occurred. On May 22, 2021, Virgin Galactic's VSS Unity launched from the spaceport with three people aboard becoming the first crewed launch from both Spaceport America and New Mexico and making New Mexico the third U.S. state, after California and Florida, to send humans into space.

Communities

Cities
 Elephant Butte
 Truth or Consequences (county seat)

Village
 Williamsburg

Census-designated places

 Arrey
 Caballo
 Hillsboro
 Hot Springs Landing
 Kingston
 Las Palomas
 Oasis
 Winston

Unincorporated communities

 Chloride
 Cuchillo
 Derry
 Engle
 Monticello
 Placitas
 Upham

Ghost towns 
 Alamocita
 Aleman
 Chise
 Elephant Butte
 Hermosa
 Lake Valley
 San Albino
 San José
 San Ygnacio de la Alamosa
 Zapata
 San Navarro  (Est: 1836  Abandoned: 1952)

Politics

Education
Truth or Consequences Schools is the school district for all of the county.

See also
 National Register of Historic Places listings in Sierra County, New Mexico

References

External links

 Sierra County Government
 Sierra County Tourism / Visitor Information
 Elephant Butte Chamber of Commerce 
 Events for Truth or Consequences, Elephant Butte, and all of Sierra County
 Wilson, John P., Between the River and the Mountains: A History of Early Settlement in Sierra County, New Mexico, Report #40, John P. Wilson, Las Cruces, New Mexico, August 1985

 
1884 establishments in New Mexico Territory
Populated places established in 1884